The U.S. state of Idaho has 16 official emblems, as designated by the Idaho Legislature. These symbols, which reflect the history and culture of the state, are often opportunities for politicians to "tie themselves to popular symbols", for teachers to highlight the legislative process to their students, and for lobbyists to "have their products given official designation".

Idaho's first official symbol was its seal, adopted in 1863 when the Idaho Territory became an organized incorporated territory of the United States. The state's second symbol was its motto, which was chosen shortly after Idaho was admitted to the Union in 1890. Five additional symbols were added between 1900 and 1950, including three in 1931 alone. Six symbols were designated between 1950 and 2000, and three additional symbols have been added since 2000. Two symbols have been adopted that were proposed by students; the Appaloosa became the state horse in 1992 following a proposal from sixth-graders from Eagle, Idaho, and in 1992 elementary school students in Boise introduced the monarch butterfly as the state insect. Idaho's most recent symbol is the peregrine falcon, adopted as the state raptor in 2004.

While some of the symbols are unique to Idaho, others are used by multiple states. For example, the mountain bluebird, Idaho's state bird, is also an official symbol for Nevada. Idaho's state fish, cutthroat trout, is also an official symbol for Wyoming, while specific subspecies of cutthroat are the state fish of Colorado, Montana, Nevada, New Mexico, and Utah. The square dance and monarch are commonly used state dances and state insects (or in some cases state butterflies), respectively.

State symbols

Unsuccessful proposals
Several symbols have been proposed for addition to the list of official state symbols but were not adopted. Prior to the designation of the cutthroat trout as the state fish, fourth grade students at Indian Creek Elementary School campaigned for the rainbow trout and the sturgeon. Another unsuccessful symbol included the silver tipped sagebrush as the state bush. In the 2010s, a student proposal for the rattlesnake as the state reptile was unsuccessful since farmer-legislators considered the snake a "pest".

See also
 History of Idaho
 Index of Idaho-related articles

References

General
 

Specific

State symbols
Idaho